Bergtóra Hanusardóttir (born 15 November 1946 in Tórshavn, Faroe Islands) is a Faroese writer and orthodontist.

Biography
She is the daughter of Mia Trónd from Tórshavn and Hanus D. Jensen from the small island Skúvoy, and is the eldest of four sisters, the others being Rannvá, Svanna and Marjun. Her sister Marjun Hanusardóttir is the Permanent Secretary (director) of the Prime Minister's Office. Bergtóra has had two children with Bogi Hansen: composer Tróndur Bogason (1976), who is married to the well-known Faroese singer Eivør Pálsdóttir and Ragnheiður Bogadóttir (1979).

As a young woman Bergtóra moved to Copenhagen in order to study dentistry. On finishing her studies in 1970, she trained as an orthodontist, finishing in 1975. She moved back to the Faroe Islands, where she was socially active in a number of ways, including sport (handball), working for equal rights for women, protesting against the EEC, and as a board member of the Women's Organization of Tórshavn (Kvinnufelagið í Havn). She has represented the Faroe Islands at international women's conferences around the world, i.e. in Beijing in 1995 and in New York City in 2000. She has her own clinic in Tórshavn.

She wrote pieces of various kinds for the women's magazine Kvinnutíðindi, where she was editor for some years, and published her first novel Skert flog in 1990. To date she has published three novels, the third one, Burtur, being published in 1990. It is about young Faroese people studying in Denmark.

Selected works

Novels 

 Skert flog, 1990 
 Suðar dýpið reyða, 1999
 Burtur, 2006

Short stories 

 Loynigongir, collection of short stories, Mentunargrunnur Studentafelagsins, 108 pages, 1993
 Eisini kærleiki, published in Frostrósan, 1987
 Katrin, published in Frostrósan, 1987
 Várvindar, published in Kvinnutíðindi, 1988
 Bonsai, 2000

Plays 

 Náttúra menniskjunar, 1984
 Heygbúgvin, 1991

Poems 

 Songartíð, 2000

Published in Kvinnutíðindi 

 Langomma, Kvinnutíðindi nr 1, 1984 
 Tilkomin kvinna, Kvinnutíðindi nr 1, 1984
 Einsamøll mamma, Kvinnutíðindi nr 1, 1984
 Kvinna í starvi, Kvinnutíðindi nr 1, 1984
 Ung kvinna og Smágenta, Kvinnutíðindi nr 1, 1984
 Prose poems in the play Kvinnur, published in Kvinnutíðindi nr.1, 1984

References 

Faroese women writers
Faroese women novelists
1946 births
Living people
Faroese short story writers
People from Tórshavn
20th-century Faroese poets
Faroese-language poets
Women dentists
Faroese feminists
Danish women short story writers
Faroese women poets
20th-century Danish short story writers
20th-century Danish women writers